The School of Mayo was an early Catholic monastery in Mayo, Ireland, founded by Saint Colmán of Lindisfarne, c.668. It became famous for sanctity and learning, but suffered from raids of natives and foreigners, especially during the 14th century.

History
The School of Mayo was situated in Mayo, County Mayo, almost equidistant from the towns of Claremorris and Castlebar. The founder, St. Colman, who flourished about the middle of the seventh century, was in all probability a native of the West of Ireland, and made his ecclesiastical studies at Iona during the abbacy of the renowned Segenius. After the death of Finan, the second Bishop of Lindisfarne, Colman was appointed to succeed him. His episcopate was much disturbed by a fierce renewal of the Easter Controversy. Colman vigorously advocated the old Irish custom, and cited the example of his predecessors, but all to no effect. At a synod specially summoned to meet at Whitby in 664, the Roman method of calculation triumphed, and Colman, unwilling to abandon the practice of the "holy elders of the Irish Church", resolved to quit Lindisfarne forever.

In 668 he crossed the seas to his native land again, and in a remote island on the western coast called Inishbofin, he built a monastery and school. These things are clearly set out in the "Historia Ecclesiastica" of Bede, who then proceeds to describe how they led to the founding of the great school of Mayo. "Colman, the Irish Bishop", says Bede, "departed from Britain and took with him all the Irish that he had assembled in the Island of Lindisfarne, and also about thirty of the English nation who had been instructed in the monastic life. . . .Afterwards he retired to a small island which is to the west of Ireland, and at some distance from the coast, called in the language of the Irish, Inishbofinde [island of the white cow]. Arriving there he built a monastery, and placed in it the monks he brought with him of both nations".

It appears, however, the Irish and English monks could not agree. Then Colman sought to put an end to their dissensions, and travelling about at length found a place in Ireland fit to build a monastery, which in the language of the Irish is called Magh Eo (Mayo).  Later on we are told by the same historian that this monastery became an important and flourishing institution, and even an episcopal see.

Though Colman, we may assume, lived mainly with his own countrymen at Inishbofin, he took a deep and practical interest in his new foundation at Mayo—"Mayo of the Saxons", as it came to be called. In the year 670, with his consent, its first canonical abbot was appointed. This was Gerald, the son of a northern English king, who, annoyed at the way Colman's most cherished convictions had been slighted at Whitby, resolved to follow him to Ireland. The school gained greatly in fame for sanctity and learning under this youthful abbot. About 679  Adamnan, the illustrious biographer of Columba, visited Mayo and according to some writers, ruled there for seven years after Gerald's death. This latter statement is not, on the face of it, improbable if Gerald, as Colgan thinks, did not live after 697; but the Four Masters give the date of his death as 13 March 726, and the "Annals of Ulster" put the event as late as 731. After Gerald's death there are only the record of isolated facts concerning the school he ruled so wisely and loved so well, but they are often facts of considerable interest and importance. The monastery was burned due to a lightning strike in 783, It burned again in 808; also—but only in the old "Life of St. Gerald" —that it was plundered by Turgesius the Dane in 818. That the monastic grounds were regarded as exceptionally holy we can gather from the entry that Domhnall, son of Torlough O'Conor, Lord of North Connacht, "the glory and the moderator and the good adviser of the Irish people" (d. 1176), was interred therein. That it had the status of an episcopal see long after the Synod of Kells (1152), is clear from the entry under the date of 1209, recording the death of "Cele O'Duffy, Bishop of Magh Eo of the Saxons."

Mayo, like the other ancient Irish monastic schools, suffered from the raids of native and foreigner, especially during the fourteenth century. But it survived them all, for the death under date 1478 is recorded of a bishop—"Bishop Higgens of Mayo of the Saxons". The time at which the See of Mayo, on the ground that it contained not a cathedral but a parochial church, was annexed to Tuam, cannot with certainty be ascertained, but as far back as 1217, during the reign of Honorius III, the question was before the Roman authorities for discussion. It was probably not settled definitively for centuries after. James O'Healy, "Bishop of Mayo of the Saxons", was put to death for the Catholic Faith at Kilmallock in 1579.

References

Religion in County Mayo
Christianity in medieval Ireland